The men's marathon event at the 1948 Summer Olympic Games took place on August 7. Forty-one athletes from 21 nations competed. The maximum number of athletes per nation had been set at 3 since the 1930 Olympic Congress. The race was won by Delfo Cabrera of Argentina, the nation's second victory in three Games (though the victories were 16 years apart). Tom Richards's silver medal put Great Britain on the podium for the third time in a row, while Étienne Gailly earned Belgium's first marathon medal with his bronze.

Reminiscent of Dorando Pietri's final-lap ordeal when the Olympics were held in the same city 40 years earlier, Gailly entered the London stadium in first place, but was exhausted and running very slowly. He was passed first by Cabrera, then by Richards, but managed to hold on for the bronze medal. South African Johannes Coleman, who finished 4th in this race, had placed 6th in the last Olympic marathon in Berlin twelve years earlier.

Background

This was the 11th appearance of the event, which is one of 12 athletics events to have been held at every Summer Olympics. Returning runners from the pre-war 1936 marathon included sixth-place finisher Johannes Coleman of South Africa. There was no clear favorite, though Viljo Heino (world record holder in the 10,000 metres) "was considered someone to watch" as he made his marathon debut.

Ireland, South Korea, and Turkey each made their first appearance in Olympic marathons. The United States made its 11th appearance, the only nation to have competed in each Olympic marathon to that point.

Competition format and course

As all Olympic marathons, the competition was a single race. The 1908 course (the first Olympic marathon at the now-standard marathon distance of 26 miles, 385 yards) was not used. Instead, a course was designed that "started and finished at Wembley Stadium, looping thru the London suburbs."

Records

These were the standing world and Olympic records prior to the 1948 Summer Olympics.

No new world or Olympic bests were set during the competition.

Schedule

All times are British Summer Time (UTC+1)

Results

References

External links
Organising Committee for the XIV Olympiad, The (1948). The Official Report of the Organising Committee for the XIV Olympiad. LA84 Foundation. Retrieved 7 September 2016.

Athletics at the 1948 Summer Olympics
Marathons at the Olympics
Men's marathons
Oly
Men's events at the 1948 Summer Olympics